Nyahunda  is a ward in Bikita District of Masvingo Province in south-eastern Zimbabwe. It is situated about 140 km south-east of provincial capital Masvingo and about 40 km south of the district centre administration Bikita. It is made up of two settlement sections, the New Reserves and the Communal Farms.

Nyahunda new reserves
The New Reserves were created around 1975 as a resettlement of families that were moved after the creation of Siya Dam. Their fields were going to be submerged in water so the then Rhodesia Settler Government bought 6 communal farms to resettle the families in the area that we now call Nyahunda New Reserves. New reserves boundary run from Nyarunwe Hill to Moza bus stop along the main dust road that goes from Nyika growth point to Mashoko Mission.From Moza bus stop, the boundary runs down along the edge of the farms, starting with Mawire farm 23, all the way past Chembazvi Hill to Mujiche river next to Chitiga farm 30. The boundary goes up from Chitiga farm up Mujiche river to Gudo Primary School where it will turn westwards past Njaravani Primary School to come the hills in Mupenyu Village back to Nyarunwe Hill. The New reserves are made up of 5 Villages namely Mupenyu, Chikuwa, Munyikwa, Mazivorwenyu, Mukavhi. The headmen submit to sub-chief Nyahunda who submits to Chief Mazungunye.

The total population of the Nyahunda New Reserves is estimated to be around 3,000 people and the families are majority communal farmers who rely on subsistence agriculture for a living. The households have family members employed locally by the government as teachers, nurses and agricultural extension officers. Some families have fathers and children working in urban areas of Zimbabwe mainly Harare, the capital city, Bulawayo and Masvingo, the provincial capital. Families also receive income from government and NGO grants and from family members living and working in diaspora, majority of them being in South Africa. Nyahunda New Reserves has significant agricultural production, each family owns a herd of at least 6 cattle, 10 acres of arable land and large numbers of goats and fowl. families there cultivate the land and sell produce including maize, cotton, groundnuts, sweet potatoes and garden vegetables. The area benefited from the government's rural electrification program with power lines running through the reserves down towards the farms. A number of homesteads have since connected to power supply.

The prominent families in the area include the Makambure clan, also called Muvavarirwa or Parunofira who are of the Musikavanhu descendents whose forefathers migrated from Mlambo or Musikavanhu chieftainship in Chipinge to settle among the Duma people under Chief Mazungunye and intermarried with the locals resulting in them permanently settling in the area around 1905. One of the surviving Muvavarirwa fathers is a long time headmaster at Nyahunda Primary School.

Nyahunda farms
These are communal farms that cover an area running from the border with new reserves and Siya Dam in the north, stretching between Turwi river in the west and Mujiche river in the east. The farm area goes down sandwiched between the two rivers down to their confluence near Mujiji primary school 25 km south of Nyarunwe Hills where the farms start. The farms start from  Chikwavira Farm 5 after the first farms were converted to resettlement areas of New reserves and run along the hills bordering Siya Dam namely Marirangwe, Chinhendere and Gandauta. Farms bordering the hills include Gono farm 9, Maravanyika farm 10, Masunungure Farm 11, Manzunzu and Ruka 13 and 14 respectively next to Turwi river and Siya Dam wall. The Nyahunda Farms border runs down along Turwi River past Bingudza farm 15, the border follows Turwi River as it flows past zaka Irrigation schemes A, B, C, D, and E in the far south. Turwi river turns eastwards near Makura Shopping centre and joins Mujiche River near Mujiji Primary School. The border then goes up northwards along Mujiche River past Tagona Secondary School to reach Chitiga Farm 30. There the border turns westwards towards Moza bus stop, then goes northwards again along the main Nyika-mashoko dust road to Nyarunwe hill. The farms are sparsely populated with less than 10 people per square kilometer. There is a lot of agricultural activity in these farms including small-scale cattle ranching, maize, millet and sorghum cropping, cotton, fowl and other livestock. There is upcoming sugar irrigation plantations in the south western area of the farms around Mutongi farm area.

Services
The main shopping centre is Ngorima Business Centre near Nyahunda Primary School. There are a number of grocer and general dealer shops including Ruwaya, Tsvatai, Ngorima and some beer halls or bars including Muchinapaya and Ngorima Hideout. There is a rural health centre that caters for the whole of Nyahunda area where there are nurses and social health workers who treat minor and low-level infectious diseases. Serious cases are referred to Mashoko Mission Hospital or Silveira Mission Hospital. There are dust roads that are plied by local bus and taxi transport, the main one being the Nyika-Mashoko dust road. It separates the Farms and New reserves from Nyarunwe hill and goes past Ngorima Shopping centre, down to Govorwi bridge and branches at makura  into two, one road going along Turwi River to Mujiji turn and Mashoko  Mission via Chiremwaremwa and Odzi Schools. The other branch crosses Turwi River to pass by Mukanga and Panganai to Mashoko Mission. Bus transport is often unreliable and expensive and the roads are currently badly damaged due to heavy rains, soil erosion and lack of maintenance.

There are six primary schools offering primary education to junior students and attendance is above 90% of local junior population. The primary schools cover kindergarten and intermediate education levels, the schools include Nyahunda, Chitenderano, Njaravani, Gudo, Turwi and Mujiji. There is only one secondary school that offers senior education, tagona secondary School which is located in the farms near Mujiche river. The schools overs Ordinary and Advanced level education that is equivalent to GCE or IGCSE UK standards. Most of the families get water from protected sources for domestic use. There are a number of government drilled and serviced underground water boreholes dotted cross the area. There is network coverage that allow use of mobile telecommunications from two main service providers Econet Wireless and the government owned NetOne. The is a low-level police post at Ngorima Shopping Centre were low-level crimes are handled and where law enforcement agents base to patrol the area. There is power supply grid running through the farms along the main dust road to Ngorima Shopping Centre and a number of dip tanks for cattle. Most people confess that they are Christians who attend local church services regularly, a big number of families go to Roman Catholic Church and majority of Christians attend Protestant church that include Anglican, Adventist, Reformed, Jehovah's Witnesses, Pentecostals like Family of God, and Apostolic churches that include Mugodhi and Johanne Masowe weChishanu.

Socio-economic challenges
The area in a low income area with majority of people living on less than US$2 per day. Weather patterns are unreliable and rains are erratic. Droughts are frequent and the last most devastating was the 1992 Zimbabwe drought that resulting in loss of 85% of cattle heard and famine that was only abated by international donations. It took over a decade for restocking to happen to previous levels. Like most Sub-Sahara Savanna regions, the area is being affected by Climatic Change and effects of Global warming. That has seen dropping of water tables, reduced levels of reservoirs, increased soil erosion, siltation and signs of desertification and unending wildfires. The number of wild animal species is decreasing due to uncontrolled hunting and climatic change as well as repeated wildfires and siltation of rivers and dams. Disposable incomes have been severely affected by a badly performing economy due to financial policies of the current government. Inconsistent monetary policies, repeated budget deficit and failure to attract foreign direct investment have resulted in govent paying its employees less, of which the majority of households in the area rely on civil servant breadwinners.

References

Wards of Zimbabwe
Bikita District
Populated places in Masvingo Province